Minyulite is a rare phosphate mineral with a chemical formula of  (redefinition, IMA21-E).

It occurs as groups of radiating fine fibrous crystals within rock cracks of phosphatic ironstone. Minyulite belongs to the orthorhombic crystal system. This indicates that it has three axes of unequal length yet all are perpendicular to each other. Its cell constants are a=9.35, b=9.74 c=5.52. 

As for its optical properties, Minyulite is an anisotropic mineral which means the velocity of light differs when traveling through it depending on the cut of its cross-section which gives it more than one refractive index.  The mineral is optically biaxial. Its birefringence value is 0.007. It has three refractive indices which are nα=1.531 nβ=1.534 nγ=1.538.  Refractive indices are a ratio of the speed of light in a median with respect to the speed of light passing through the mineral.

Occurrence

It was first described in 1933 for an occurrence in Western Australia and named after the type locality, Minyulo Well in Western Australia.

Minyulite is considered as a secondary phosphate since it is formed by the alteration of a primary phosphate. It occurs in association with dufrenite, apatite, fluellite, wavellite, variscite and leucophosphite.

The mineral can be found in the underlying phosphatized rock zone of ornithogenic soil. Minyulite is not found in abundance, it can be found in the seashore of the maritime Arctic.

References

Phosphate minerals
Orthorhombic minerals
Minerals in space group 32
Potassium minerals
Aluminium minerals